Taoist sexual practices are the ways Taoists may practice sexual activity.  These practices are also known as "joining energy" or "the joining of the essences".  Practitioners believe that by performing these sexual arts, one can stay in good health, and attain longevity or spiritual advancement.

History
Some Taoist sects during the Han dynasty performed sexual intercourse as a spiritual practice, called héqì (lit. "joining energy"). The first sexual texts that survive today are those found at Mawangdui. While Taoism had not yet fully evolved as a philosophy at this time, these texts shared some remarkable similarities with later Tang dynasty texts, such as the Ishinpō. The sexual arts arguably reached their climax  between the end of the Han dynasty and the end of the Tang dynasty. 

After AD 1000, Confucian restraining attitudes towards sexuality became stronger, so that by the beginning of the Qing dynasty in 1644, sex was a taboo topic in public life. These Confucians alleged that the separation of genders in most social activities existed 2,000 years ago and suppressed the sexual arts. Because of the taboo surrounding sex, there was much censoring done during the Qing in literature, and the sexual arts disappeared in public life. As a result, some of the texts survived only in Japan, and most scholars had no idea that such a different concept of sex existed in early China.

Ancient and medieval practices

Qi (lifeforce) and jing (essence)
The basis of all Taoist thinking is that qi is part of everything in existence. Qi is related to another energetic substance contained in the human body known as jing , and once all this has been expended the body dies. Jing can be lost in many ways, but most notably through the loss of body fluids. Taoists may use practices to stimulate/increase and conserve their bodily fluids to great extents. The fluid believed to contain the most jing is semen. Therefore, Taoists believe in decreasing the frequency of, or totally avoiding, ejaculation in order to conserve life essence.

Male control of ejaculation
Many Taoist practitioners link the loss of ejaculatory fluids to the loss of vital life force: where excessive fluid loss results in premature aging, disease, and general fatigue. While some Taoists contend that one should never ejaculate, others provide a specific formula to determine the maximum number of regular ejaculations in order to maintain health.

The general idea is to limit the loss of fluids as much as possible to the level of your desired practice. As these sexual practices were passed down over the centuries, some practitioners have given less importance to the limiting of ejaculation. This variety has been described as "...while some declare non-ejaculation injurious, others condemn ejaculating too fast in too much haste." Nevertheless, the "retention of the semen" is one of the foundational tenets of Taoist sexual practice.

There are different methods to control ejaculation prescribed by the Taoists. In order to avoid ejaculation, the man could do one of several things. He could pull out immediately before orgasm, a method also more recently termed as "coitus conservatus." A second method involved the man applying pressure on the perineum, thus retaining the sperm. While if done incorrectly this can cause retrograde ejaculation, the Taoists believed that the jing traveled up into the head and "nourished the brain." Cunnilingus was believed to be ideal by preventing the loss of semen and vaginal liquids.

Practice control
Another important concept of "the joining of the essences" was that the union of a man and a woman would result in the creation of jing, a type of sexual energy. When in the act of lovemaking, jing would form, and the man could transform some of this jing into qi, and replenish his lifeforce. By having as much sex as possible, men had the opportunity to transform more and more jing, and as a result would see many health benefits.

Yin and yang
The concept of yin and yang is important in Taoism and consequently also holds special importance in sex. Yang usually referred to the male sex, whereas yin could refer to the female sex. Man and woman were the equivalent of heaven and earth, but became disconnected. Therefore, while heaven and earth are eternal, man and woman suffer a premature death.  Every interaction between yin and yang had significance. Because of this significance, every position and action in lovemaking had importance. Taoist texts described a large number of special sexual positions that served to cure or prevent illness, similar to the Kama Sutra.

There was the notion that men released yang during orgasm, while women shed yin during theirs. Every orgasm from the user would nourish the partner's energy.

Women
For Taoists, sex was not just about pleasing a man. The woman also had to be stimulated and pleased in order to benefit from the act of sex. Sunü (素女), female advisor to the Yellow Emperor (Huangdi), noted ten important indications of female satisfaction. If sex were performed in this manner, the woman would create more jing, and the man could more easily absorb the jing to increase his own qi.

According to Jolan Chang, in early Chinese history, women played a significant role in the Tao of loving, and that the degeneration into subordinate roles came much later in Chinese history. Women were also given a prominent place in the Ishinpō, with the tutor being a woman. One of the reasons women had a great deal of strength in the act of sex was that they walked away undiminished from the act. The woman had the power to bring forth life, and did not have to worry about ejaculation or refractory period. To quote Laozi from the Tao Te Ching: "The Spirit of the Valley is inexhaustible... Draw on it as you will, it never runs dry."

Women also helped men extend their lives. Many of the ancient texts were dedicated explanations of how a man could use sex to extend his own life but, his life was extended only through the absorption of the woman's vital energies (jing and qi). Some Taoists came to call the act of sex "the battle of stealing and strengthening". These sexual methods could be correlated with Taoist military methods. Instead of storming the gates, the battle was a series of feints and maneuvers that would sap the enemy's resistance. Fang described this battle as "the ideal was for a man to 'defeat' the 'enemy' in the sexual 'battle' by keeping himself under complete control so as not to emit semen, while at the same time exciting the woman until she reached orgasm and shed her Yin essence, which was then absorbed by the man."

Jolan Chang points out that it was after the Tang dynasty (AD 618–906) that "the Tao of Loving" was "steadily corrupted", and that it was these later corruptions that reflected battle imagery and elements of a "vampire" mindset. Other research into early Taoism found more harmonious attitudes of yin-yang communion.

Multiple partners
This practice was not limited to male on female, however, as it was possible to women to do the same in turn with the male yang. The deity known as the Queen Mother of the West was described to have no husband, instead having intercourse with young virgin males to nourish her female element.

Age of partners
Some Ming dynasty Taoist sects believed that one way for men to achieve longevity or 'towards immortality' is by having intercourse with virgins, particularly young virgins. Taoist sexual books by Liangpi and Sanfeng call the female partner ding (鼎) and recommend sex with premenarche virgins.

Liangpi concludes that the ideal ding is a pre-menarche virgin just under 14 years of age and women older than 18 should be avoided. Sanfeng went further and divided ding partners into three ranks of descending importance: premenarche virgins aged 14-16, menstruating virgins aged 16-20 and women aged 21-25.

According to Ge Hong, a 4th-century Taoist alchemist, "those seeking 'immortality' must perfect the absolute essentials. These consist of treasuring the jing, circulating the qi, and consuming the great medicine." The sexual arts concerned the first precept, treasuring the jing. This is partially because treasuring the jing involved sending it up into the brain. In order to send the jing into the brain, the male had to refrain from ejaculation during sex. According to some Taoists, if this was done, the jing would travel up the spine and nourish the brain instead of leaving the body. Ge Hong also states, however, that it is folly to believe that performing the sexual arts only can achieve immortality and some of the ancient myths on sexual arts had been misinterpreted and exaggerated. Indeed, the sexual arts had to be practiced alongside alchemy to attain longevity. Ge Hong also warned it could be dangerous if practiced incorrectly.

See also
 Jiutian Xuannü, goddess of sexuality as well as warfare and longevity
 Tantric sex
 Sex magic
 Aiki (Japanese)
Yangsheng (Daoism)

Notes

References

Contemporary texts
David Deida. The Superior Lover.  2001.
Chang, Jolan. The Tao of Love and Sex. Plume, 1977.
Chang, Stephen T.. The Tao of Sexology: The Book of Infinite Wisdom. Tao Longevity LLC, 1986.
Chia, Mantak and Maneewan. Healing Love Through the Tao: Cultivating Female Sexual Energy. Healing Tao, 1986.
Chia, Mantak and Michael Winn. Taoist Secrets of Love: Cultivating Male Sexual Energy. Aurora, 1984.
Chia, Mantak and Douglas Abrams Arava. The Multi-Orgasmic Man. HarperCollins, 1996.
Chia, Mantak and Maneewan. The Multi-Orgasmic Couple. HarperOne, 2002.
Chia, Mantak and Rachel Carlton Abrams. The Multi-Orgasmic Woman. Rodale, 2005.
Frantzis, Bruce. Taoist Sexual Meditation. North Atlantic Books, 2012.
Holden, Lee and Rachel Carlton Abrams. Taoist Sexual Secrets: Harness Your Qi Energy for Ecstasy, Vitality, and Transformation - Audio CD set. Sounds True, 2010.
Hsi Lai. The Sexual Teachings of the White Tigress: Secrets of the Female Taoist Masters.  Destiny Books, 2001.
Needham, Joseph. Science and Civilization in China, 5:2. Cambridge: Cambridge University, 1983.
Reid, Daniel P. The Tao of Health, Sex & Longevity. Simon & Schuster, 1989.
 Robinet, Isabelle. Taoism: Growth of a Religion (Stanford: Stanford University Press, 1997 [original French 1992]). 
Van Gulik, Robert. The Sexual Life of Ancient China: A Preliminary Survey of Chinese Sex and Society from ca. 1500 B.C. till 1644 A.D. Leiden: Brill, 1961.  
Ruan Fang Fu. Sex in China: Studies in Sexology in Chinese Culture Plenum Press, 1991.  
Wik, Mieke and Stephan. Beyond Tantra: Healing through Taoist Sacred Sex. Findhorn Press, 2005.
Wile, Douglas. The Art of the Bedchamber: The Chinese Sexual Yoga Classics including Women's Solo Meditation Texts. Albany: State University of New York, 1992.
Zettnersan, Chian. Taoist Bedroom Secrets, Twin Lakes, WI: Lotus Press, 2002.

Classical texts
 Su Nu Jing
 Health Benefits of the Bedchamber
 Ishinpō (醫心方)
 "Priceless Recipe" by Sun S'su-Mo (Tang)
 "Hsiu Chen Yen I" by Wu Hsien (Han)

External links
 Chinese Sexology "Seizing Immortality from the Jaws of Impermanence"
 The Great Tao Answers to Everyday Problems.
 History of Taoist Sexual Development in China 
Sample of the Taoist Manuals

Sexology
Sexual acts
Sexuality and religion
Sexuality in China
Taoist practices